Southern Garrett High School is a public high school in Oakland, Maryland, United States, that houses over 700 students from the Southern Garrett County vicinity. The school mascot is a Ram and the school colors are red and white.

References

Oakland, Maryland
Public high schools in Maryland
High schools in Garrett County, Maryland